This is the results breakdown of the local elections held in the Region of Murcia on 26 May 2019. The following tables show detailed results in the autonomous community's most populous municipalities, sorted alphabetically.

Opinion polls

City control
The following table lists party control in the most populous municipalities, including provincial capitals (shown in bold). Gains for a party are displayed with the cell's background shaded in that party's colour.

Municipalities

Cartagena
Population: 213,943

Lorca
Population: 93,079

Murcia
Population: 447,182

See also
2019 Murcian regional election

References

Murcia
2019